Mitrella verdensis is a species of sea snail in the family Columbellidae, the dove snails.

References

verdensis
Gastropods described in 1956